Daniel Widmer (born April 29, 1953) is a retired Swiss professional ice hockey left winger who represented the Swiss national team at the 1976 Winter Olympics.

References

External links

1953 births
Living people
EHC Biel players
Ice hockey players at the 1976 Winter Olympics
Olympic ice hockey players of Switzerland
Swiss ice hockey left wingers